Andrew Bagg (born June 8, 1981), better known by his stage name DJ Cobra, is an open format deejay.

Early life and career 
DJ Cobra's career was launched while attending the University of Arizona. DJ Cobra started cold-calling Record Labels and telling them he was the Hip-Hop Music Director at U of A's radio station. This led to free concerts, cultivating relationships with artist's managers and labels and, most importantly, free records. After submitting a mix tape to the Mix Show Director and On-Air Personality at 98.3 (KOHT – iheartradio station in Tucson), Andrew became one of the youngest DJs in the country on Commercial radio. He had the #1 ratings across the board and since the station was BDS affiliated, Record Labels and Promoters were coming to him to get spins for their artists. The labels offered him jobs, but after much thought, DJ Cobra took a different career path. He went on to open for artists, formed a DJ crew back in LA for a period of time (again recognizing an opportunity as bottle service was blowing up and Paris Hilton was the “It” girl), went on his first tour in 2003 opening for Nelly.

DJ Cobra holds multiple residencies in Hollywood, San Diego, Chicago and Las Vegas, and spins at clubs throughout the United States. With over 300 performances a year and monthly residences in multiple cities, Cobra appears internationally more than any other open format DJ. Cobra has also toured, opened for or performed with over fifty gold & platinum recording artists including P. Diddy, Prince, Ludacris, Nelly, John Legend and Lady Gaga.

In the corporate and private event world, DJ Cobra continues to play events in the United States such as Paris Hilton’s 30th Bday party in Hollywood, The Wesinstein’s Golden Globe Party, Ferrari’s 458 Launch party with John Mayer, MTV BlackBerry VMA Party with Ne-Yo, The South Beach Food and Wine Festival, Aubrey Oday's All About Aubrey Launch Event, Miley Cyrus’s 18th birthday party, AT&T and Fox American Idol official events, Star Magazine’s Young Hollywood Event, Hollywood Life’s Young Hollywood Awards, NASCAR Event with Danica Patrick, South Park’s 200th Anniversary Event MTV’s Real World Cast Party in Las Vegas, Madonna’s Material Girl launch party with Kelly Osbourne, Jamie Foxx’s NBA All Star Weekend party, and others.

DJ Cobra toured with culinary great and host of NBC’s “Minute to Win it,” Guy Fieri, in 2010 and returned to the road with him in 2011, for a second straight tour. Cobra was the featured deejay on Good Morning America’s Oscar Special. He also has made numerous television appearances on shows including Jimmy Kimmel Live!, Last Call with Carson Daly and Comics Unleashed.

Discography

Mixtapes
Iller (2009)
Illionaire (2011)

Filmography
Comics Unleashed (2006–2008)
The Best of Comics Unleashed with Byron Allen (2008)
Jimmy Kimmel appearance with "The Knux" (2008)
Storage Wars (2013)

References

External links
 Official website
 Download Albums
 Artist Direct

1981 births
Living people
American DJs